Batrachedra helarcha is a species of moth of the family Batrachedridae. It is found in Australia.

Original description

External links
Australian Faunal Directory

Batrachedridae
Moths of Australia
Moths described in 1897